Oh Chang-Sik  (born March 27, 1984) is a South Korean football player.

References

External links 
 

1984 births
Living people
South Korean footballers
Ulsan Hyundai FC players
Gimcheon Sangmu FC players
Daejeon Korail FC players
K League 1 players
Korea National League players
Konkuk University alumni
Association football defenders